Foxley is a village and civil parish in the English county of Norfolk.

History
Foxley's name is of Anglo-Saxon origin and derives from the Old English for fox's forest clearing or glade.

Norfolk Heritage discusses the archaeology of the Parish and states that there is evidence of a settlement here in the Saxon period. "The earliest prehistoric finds date to the Neolithic Era there was activity in the parish from much earlier than the Saxon period". The oldest building is the former Chequers Pub (NHER 19249) from the 1700s but a survey found carpenters' marks in the interior from 1624.

In the Domesday Book, Foxley is listed as a settlement of 12 households in the hundred of Eynesford. In 1086, the village was part of the East Anglian estates of Alan of Brittany.

Foxley Mill was built in 1845 by the miller, William Elvin, using a wind-powered mechanism. By the 1980s, the mill fell out of use and was subsequently used as an art gallery until 1990 when it was turned into a private residence.

In July 1944, two B-24 Liberators of the 392nd Bomb Group, USAAF, based at RAF Wendling, crashed in the parish after a mid-air collision. The crash site was a field to the west of the Old Rectory and fragments from the crashes are regularly ploughed up by local farmers.

Geography
According to the 2011 Census, Foxley has a population of 285 residents living in 133 households.

Foxley falls within the constituency of Broadland and is represented at Parliament by Jerome Mayhew MP of the Conservative Party. For the purposes of local government, the parish falls within the Upper Wensum Ward of district of Breckland and the Elmham and Mattishall Division of Norfolk County Council.

St. Thomas' Church
Foxley's parish church is dedicated to Saint Thomas and dates from the late-Thirteenth and early-Fourteenth Centuries. St. Thomas' interior features a Fourteenth Century font and a dado depicting Saint Ambrose, Saint Gregory, Saint Jerome and Saint Augustine which dates from 1472 and was paid for by John and Agnes Baymont.

Notable Buildings
Grade II listed structures within the community are the Foxley War Memorial, the Church of St Thomas and Foxley Lodge, a former rectory constructed in the early 1840s. The style of the Lodge is Georgian, described in 1984 as "brick with slate roofs. Roughly square in plan. 2 storeys. 3 bays to each of 3 facades".  The manor was restored in the 1930s; the property was operated as a dairy farm until some time before 2017. The property includes the seven bedroom manor, outbuildsings, orchards, and three gardens which were planned by Verity Hanson-Smith. 

The current Church of St Thomas was first built in the 1100s, probably on the site of a previous church from the Saxon period. The structure was extensively modified through the 1400s; some additional work was done in the 1600s and in the early 1800s. In the Listing Report of 1960, the church was described as "Flint with ashlar and some brick dressings. Slate and pantile roofs". In 2018, the Church of England was hoping that the care of this church would be accepted by The Diocesan Churches Trust.

A five-minute drive from the village centre, Foxley Wood is a site of special scientific interest and the largest remaining area of ancient woodland in Norfolk, England. Operated by the Norfolk Wildlife Trust, parts of the 123 hectare (300 acre) reserve are thought to be over 6000 years old, dating from the end of the last ice age. The reserve is a Nature Conservation Review site and a National Nature Reserve.

War Memorial
Foxley's war memorial takes the form of a stone obelisk atop a trapezoid base, located at the junction of the A1067 and Old Fakenham Road. The memorial lists the following names for the First World War:
 Cpl. James O. Armiger (d.1918), 2nd Bn., Royal Irish Rifles
 Pvt. Daniel W. Parfitt (1897-1917), 1/4th Bn., Royal Norfolk Regiment
 Rfn. Edward Chaplain (1897-1916), 21st (Surrey Rifles) Bn., London Regiment

And, the following for the Second World War:
 LAC Angus Ross (d.1943), Royal Air Force

References

External Links

Villages in Norfolk
Breckland District
Civil parishes in Norfolk